Oenopota kakumensis is an extinct species of sea snail, a marine gastropod mollusk in the family Mangeliidae.

Description

Distribution
This extinct marine species was found in Tertiary strata in the Isikawa and Toyama Prefectures, Japan

References

External links
 Worldwide Mollusc Species Database : Oenopota kakumensis

kakumensis
Gastropods described in 1938
Prehistoric gastropods